The women's individual was an archery event held as part of the Archery at the 1996 Summer Olympics programme. Like other archery events at the Olympics, it featured the recurve discipline. All archery was done at a range of 70 metres. 64 archers competed.

The same basic competition format as in 1992 was used, though there were some significant changes. The competition began with a 72-arrow ranking round (down from 144 arrows in 1992).  This was followed by three elimination rounds (up from two in 1992; the increase allowed every archer to advance to the elimination), in which archers competed head-to-head in 18-arrow matches (up from 12 arrows in 1992). After these rounds, there were 8 archers left. The quarterfinals, semifinals, and medal matches (collectively termed the "finals round") were 12-arrow matches.  In all matches, losers were eliminated and received a final rank determined by their score in that round, with the exception of the semifinals. The losers of the semifinals competed in the bronze medal match.

Records
Natalia Nasaridze set a new Olympic record for an 18-arrow match in the round of 64 by shooting 168. Yoon's score of 331 in the R32/R16 combined set a new Olympic record even as she was defeated by one point in the round. Kim's score of 113 in the gold medal match was an Olympic record.  It also contributed to a score of 330 in the 36-arrow finals round beginning with the quarterfinal, another Olympic record.

Results

Competition bracket

Section 1
The #1-ranked archer after the ranking round, Lina Herasymenko, fell in the round of 32.

Section 2

Section 3

Section 4
The largest upset of the round of 64 occurred when #55 Nurfitriyana Lantang defeated #10 Anna Mozhar.

Finals

References

Sources
 Official Report
 

Archery at the 1996 Summer Olympics
1996 in women's archery
Women's events at the 1996 Summer Olympics